Sigurd Maseng (born March 1, 1894 - died April 20, 1952) was a diplomat in the Norwegian Foreign Service. Raised in Oslo, he entered the Foreign Service in 1918. He was sent to the United States in 1936 to serve as the Vice-Consul in Chicago, home of a large Norwegian community. In 1947 he was promoted to the post of Consul General, which he served as until his death in 1952. He was a commander of the Order of the British Empire and a Knight, First Class, of the Order of St. Olav.

His brother Einar Maseng was also a Norwegian diplomat.

References

Lovoll, Odd S.  A Century of Urban Life: the Norwegians in Chicago before 1930 (Northfield, MN: Norwegian American Historical Association, 1988)
Strand, A. E.  A History of the Norwegians of Illinois  (Chicago: J. Anderson, 1905)

1894 births
1952 deaths
Norwegian diplomats
Norwegian expatriates in the United States
Honorary Commanders of the Order of the British Empire